
Gmina Warta is an urban-rural gmina (administrative district) in Sieradz County, Łódź Voivodeship, in central Poland.

Villages
Apart from the town of Warta, Gmina Warta contains the villages and settlements of Augustynów, Bartochów, Baszków, Borek Lipiński, Chorążka, Cielce, Czartki, Duszniki, Dzierzązna, Gać Warcka, Głaniszew, Glinno, Gołuchy, Góra, Grabinka, Grzybki, Jakubice, Jeziorsko, Józefka, Józefów-Wiktorów, Kamionacz, Kawęczynek, Klonówek, Krąków, Łabędzie, Lasek, Lipiny, Małków, Maszew, Miedze, Miedźno, Mikołajewice, Mogilno, Nobela, Ostrów Warcki, Pierzchnia Góra, Piotrowice, Proboszczowice, Raczków, Raszelki, Rossoszyca, Rożdżały, Socha, Tądów Dolny, Tądów Górny, Tomisławice, Ustków, Witów, Włyń, Wola Miłkowska, Wola Zadąbrowska, Zadąbrów-Rudunek, Zadąbrów-Wiatraki, Zagajew, Zakrzew, Zaspy and Zielęcin.

Neighbouring gminas
Gmina Warta is bordered by the gminas of Błaszki, Dobra, Goszczanów, Pęczniew, Sieradz, Szadek, Wróblew, Zadzim and Zduńska Wola.

References
Polish official population figures 2006

Warta
Sieradz County